Rob Alflen (born 7 May 1968) is a Dutch football manager and former player who is the assistant manager of Dutch Eredivisie club SC Cambuur.

Playing career

Club
Alflen was born in Utrecht. He played for FC Utrecht, Ajax Amsterdam, Vitesse Arnhem, Sparta Rotterdam, and Cambuur Leeuwarden in the Eredivisie.

Managerial career
Since 2004, Alflen has been co-presenter of the TV program Namen & Rugnummer on RTV Utrecht. Alflen started his coaching career as a youth coach of FC De Bilt, and later became manager of the first team for the 2006–07 season. In the following season, he became assistant manager of HFC Haarlem but still remained as manager of De Bilt. From 2008 until 2010, he was manager of FC Breukelen. In February 2009, he also took a job at Jong FC Utrecht as manager of the team alongside his manager job at Breukelen.

When Erwin Koeman quit as head coach of FC Utrecht in October 2011, Alflen was assigned as assistant coach of Jan Wouters for the first team of FC Utrecht. He became head coach after Wouters left the club in June 2014. On 25 March 2015 FC Utrecht said that coach Alflen and his advisor Co Adriaanse would step down from their roles with the Dutch club at the end of the season. On 11 January 2016 he became an assistant at Heracles after Hendrie Krüzen left the club. On 16 April 2018, it was announced that Alflen would take over as the head coach of Helmond Sport on a two-year contract starting next season. On 8 May 2019, Helmond announced, that they had sacked Alflen after a disappointing season, the worst season in the club's history with only four victories in 38 games.

Personal life
Alflen's father was the Dutch wrestling champion Loek Alflen.

Career statistics

References

1968 births
Living people
Footballers from Utrecht (city)
Dutch footballers
Association football midfielders
FC Utrecht players
AFC Ajax players
SBV Vitesse players
Sparta Rotterdam players
Heracles Almelo players
SC Cambuur players
UEFA Cup winning players
Eredivisie players
Eerste Divisie players
Dutch football managers
FC Utrecht managers
Helmond Sport managers
Eredivisie managers
Eerste Divisie managers
Heracles Almelo non-playing staff